Out of the Darkness, Into the Light is a compilation album by Dolomite released on June 16, 1998. This album includes popular names such as the Kottonmouth Kings and The Untouchables along with many others.

Track listing

References

1998 compilation albums